The 1992 UMass Minutemen football team represented the University of Massachusetts Amherst in the 1992 NCAA Division I-AA football season as a member of the Yankee Conference. The team was coached by Mike Hodges and played its home games at Warren McGuirk Alumni Stadium in Hadley, Massachusetts. The 1992 season was Hodges' first as head coach of the Minutemen. UMass finished the season with a record of 7–3 overall and 5–3 in conference play.

Schedule

References

UMass
UMass Minutemen football seasons
UMass Minutemen football